Neal Skupski and Desirae Krawczyk defeated Joe Salisbury and Harriet Dart in the final, 6–2, 7–6(7–1), to win the mixed doubles tennis title at the 2021 Wimbledon Championships. It was Krawczyk's second consecutive major title in mixed doubles, following her success at the French Open.

Ivan Dodig and Latisha Chan were the defending champions from when the tournament was last held in 2019, but lost in the third round to John Peers and Zhang Shuai.

Seeds
All seeds received a bye into the second round.

Draw

Finals

Top half

Section 1

Section 2

Bottom half

Section 3

Section 4

Other entry information

Wild cards

Protected ranking

Alternates

Withdrawals
During the tournament

See also
2021 Wimbledon Championships – Day-by-day summaries

References

External links
 Mixed Doubles draw

X=Mixed Doubles
2021